Charmaine Chew (born 1996) is a Malaysian beauty pageant titleholder, social media influencer, model and emcee who was crowned Miss International Malaysia 2019.

Personal life
Chew is a Malaysian Chinese and hails from Alor Setar, the state capital of Kedah. She is pursuing a degree in public relations and mass communication at Taylor's University Lakeside Campus. She is a gamer and avid Muay Thai fan.

In 2018, she was invited to speak at TEDxYouth at Sri KDU International School in Petaling Jaya, Selangor. In November 2019, she is selected to be the International Grand Symposium Speaker at the International Model United Nations Malaysia 2019 in Taylor's University, Subang Jaya, Selangor.

Pageantry

Miss Universe Malaysia 2018 
Chew competed in her first beauty pageant, Miss Universe Malaysia 2018 when she was twenty-one years old. She was the top 10 finalist of Miss Universe Malaysia 2018 and awarded the subsidiary title Miss Miko Galere.

Miss International Malaysia 2019 
In October 2019, Chew was appointed as Miss International Malaysia 2019 by the official licensee, Miss International Malaysia. She was selected from a list of suggestions by local pageant fans.

Miss International 2019 
As Miss International Malaysia 2019, Chew represented Malaysia at the Miss International 2019 competition in Tokyo, Japan on 12 November 2019, where Sireethorn Leearamwat of Thailand emerged as the eventual winner.

References

External links
 

1997 births
Living people
Malaysian beauty pageant winners
Malaysian female models
Miss International 2019 delegates
People from Kedah